The 2018 Oldham Council election took place on 3 May 2018 to elect members of Oldham Council in England. The election took place on the same day as other local elections in England. The election saw the majority Labour Party increase its number of seats by two. The Conservative Party also gained two seats, while the Liberal Democrats lost one seat. UKIP ceased to have representation on the council following this election. The election left Labour with 47 seats, the Liberal Democrats 8 and the Conservatives 4 with the remaining seat being held by an Independent.

Results 
Vote share changes compared to 2016.

Ward results
Councillors seeking re-election are denoted with an asterisk. They were elected in 2014 and changes in vote share are compared on that basis.

Alexandra

Chadderton Central
Due to a vacancy 2 candidates were elected to this ward. The candidate with the most votes received a full 4-year term and the second-placed candidate received the remaining term of the vacated seat.

Chadderton North

Chadderton South

Coldhurst

Crompton

Failsworth East

Failsworth West
Warren Bates was elected for UKIP in 2014.

Hollinwood
Due to a vacancy 2 candidates were elected to this ward. The candidate with the most votes received a full 4-year term and the second-placed candidate received the remaining term of the vacated seat.

Medlock Vale

Royton North

Royton South

Saddleworth North 
Incumbent councillor Nicola Kirkham did not stand; she was elected as an independent in 2014 before joining Labour in 2016.

Saddleworth South

Saddleworth West & Lees
Incumbent UKIP councillor Peter Klonowski did not stand.

Shaw

St. James

St. Mary's

Waterhead

Werneth

Changes after this election

Failsworth East by-election: 29 November 2018

Labour party suspensions: September 2018
2 councillors were suspended from the Labour party in September 2018:
 Montaz Ali Azad (Coldhurst ward)
 James Larkin (Royton North ward)

References

2018 English local elections
2018
2010s in Greater Manchester